Anika Niederwieser (born 28 February 1992) is an Italian handballer who plays for Thüringer HC and the Italy national team. 

She won the Bundesliga in 2018, the DHB Supercup in 2016 and the bronze medal at the Beach Handball European Championships in 2011 and 2015 respectively. Her brother and father were handball players as well.

Achievements
Bundesliga:
Winner: 2018
DHB-Supercup:
Winner: 2016

Individual awards 
 Best Defender of the Beach Handball World Championships: 2014

References
  

1992 births
Living people
Sportspeople from Brixen
Italian female handball players
Expatriate handball players
Italian expatriate sportspeople in Germany
Mediterranean Games competitors for Italy
Competitors at the 2018 Mediterranean Games